Kyzyl-Jar is an urban-type settlement in Jalal-Abad Region, Kyrgyzstan. The town is administratively subordinated to the town Tash-Kömür. Its population was 3,340 in 2021.

Population

References

Populated places in Jalal-Abad Region